The Champlain Valley Transportation Museum in Plattsburgh, New York, United States, founded in 2000 to be a museum dedicated to the history of Lozier Motors, has grown in scope to cover all the transportation in the region. It includes artifacts and displays on the history of land and water based transportation in the region, especially on Lake Champlain and the St. Lawrence Seaway.

The museum was the idea of Anthony Vaccaro, a Plattsburgh physician, who owned and restored a 1915 Lozier. He saw a museum dedicated to Lozier Motors as a way of promoting Plattsburgh's rich history. Despite the museum's expanded scope, the Lozier remains its centerpiece. The museum's Type 82 Lozier is the only known Type 82 in existence.

The museum officially opened on the site of the former Plattsburgh Air Force Base in 2004 with the help of a corps of volunteers. Its permanent collection includes two Lozier Automobiles. Also housed at the museum are the Bill Gates Diner (a cafe housed in a trolley car), a 1924 REO Speed Wagon used by Plattsburgh Motor Services' founder Walter Church, a 1929 Model A Ford and a 1967 Jaguar.
1903 Oldsmobile (Reproduction)
1910 National Speedster
1911 Kissell Kar Speedster
1914 Lozier 5 Passenger Touring
1915 Lozier 7 Passenger Touring
1915 Ford Model T Roadster
1917 Ford Model T Race Car
1918 Dodge Limousine
1923 Dodge 5 Passenger Touring
1924 REO Truck
1925 Ford Model T Bobtail Racer
1927 Pierce Arrow Sedan
1929 Ford Model A Touring Right Hand Drive
1930 Ford Model AA w/Compressor
1930 Ford Huckster Truck
1930 Ford 5 Window Coupe
1934 Dodge Fire Truck
1940 DeSoto Taxi
1942 Willys Jeep
1947 Crosley Coupe
1948 Plymouth Coupe (Fire Chief's Car)
1948 Dodge Convertible
1949 Dodge Sedan
1949 Riley LeMans Roadster (Country of origin: UK)
1953 Triumph Renown Saloon (Country of origin: UK)
1956 Buick Century
1957 Ford Skyliner
1960 BMW Isetta
1960 Cadillac Deville Hardtop
1965 Ford Mustang Convertible
1967 Jaguar XK-E Roadster (Country of origin: UK)
1969 Pontiac Trans-Am
1970 Pontiac Trans-Am
1981 Home-Built Electric Towncar
Following a 2006 grant that helped establish the museum, in 2007, the museum received a $1 million grant from the New York State Department of Transportation to assist in the 
upgrade of the museum's infrastructure. The museum is required to raise $200,000 in order to receive the grant and in January 2008 it began a capital campaign to achieve this goal.

References

Museums in Clinton County, New York
Museums established in 2000
Transportation museums in New York (state)
Automobile museums in New York (state)
2000 establishments in New York (state)